Mauna Ala (Fragrant Hills) in the Hawaiian language, is the Royal Mausoleum of Hawaii (also called Royal Mausoleum State Monument) and the final resting place of Hawaii's two prominent royal families: the Kamehameha Dynasty and the Kalākaua Dynasty.

Background
In the early 19th century, the area near an ancient burial site was known as Pohukaina. It is believed to be the name of a chief (sometimes spelled Pahukaina) who according to legend chose a cave in Kanehoalani in the Koʻolau Range for his resting place. The land belonged to Kekauluohi, who later ruled as Kuhina Nui, as part of her birthright.

After 1825, the first Western-style royal tomb was constructed for the bodies of King Kamehameha II and his queen Kamāmalu near the current ʻIolani Palace. They were buried on August 23, 1825. The idea was heavily influenced by the tombs at Westminster Abbey during Kamehameha II's trip to London. The mausoleum was a small house made of coral blocks with a thatched roof. It had no windows, and it was the duty of two chiefs to guard the iron-locked koa door day and night. No one was allowed to enter the vault except for burials or Memorial Day, a Hawaiian holiday celebrated on December 30. Over time, as more bodies were added, the small vault became crowded, so other chiefs and retainers were buried in unmarked graves nearby. In 1865 a selected twenty coffins were removed to a Royal Mausoleum named Mauna ʻAla in Nuʻuanu Valley. But many chiefs remain on the site including: Keaweʻīkekahialiʻiokamoku, Kalaniʻōpuʻu, Chiefess Kapiʻolani, and Haʻalilio.

Construction
The 2.7 acre (11,000 m2) mausoleum was designed by architect Theodore Heuck. King Kamehameha IV and Queen Emma planned it as a burial site for their families.  However, the first to be interred was their four-year-old son, Prince Albert, who died August 27, 1862.
King Kamehameha IV became ill soon afterwards and died November 30, 1863, just 15 months after his son. His brother Lot Kamehameha came to the throne as King Kamehameha V.

Immediately Kamehameha V started construction of the mausoleum building.  The Right Reverend Thomas Nettleship Staley, first Anglican Bishop of Honolulu (1823–1898), oversaw construction. The west ('Ewa) wing was completed at the end of January 1864. A large funeral procession February 3, 1864, brought the body of Kamehameha IV from Iolani Palace near Kawaiahao Church. His casket was placed on a stand in the new wing. Later in the evening, bearers brought the casket of Ka Haku o Hawai'i (as Prince Albert was known) and laid him to rest alongside his father. Queen Emma was so overcome with grief that she camped on the grounds of Mauna Ala, and slept in the mausoleum.

The mausoleum was completed in 1865, adjacent to the public 1844 Oahu Cemetery. The mausoleum seemed a fitting place to bury other past monarchs of the Kingdom of Hawaii and their families.  The remains were transferred in a solemn ceremony leading from the burial vault called Pohukaina at Iolani Palace to the Nuuanu Valley October 30, 1865.

Robert Crichton Wyllie, Minister of Foreign Affairs, was buried here in October 1865.
Over time, the remains of almost all of Hawaii's monarchs, their consorts, and various princes and princesses would rest at the Royal Mausoleum. Kamehameha I and William Charles Lunalilo are the only two kings not resting at the mausoleum.  William Charles Lunalilo, the shortest-reigning Hawaiian monarch, (one year and 25 days only), was buried in a church cemetery resting in the courtyard of Kawaiahao Church. Princess Nāhienaena and Queen Keōpūolani are buried on Maui at Waiola Church.

Kamehameha I's remains were hidden in a traditional practice to preserve the mana (power) of the alii at the time of the Hawaiian religion. For several generations, descendants of Hoolulu, one of the few chosen to help bury the remains of Kamehameha, have been appointed as caretakers.

Mauna Ala was removed from the public lands of the United States by a joint resolution of Congress in 1900, two years after the Annexation in 1898 of Hawaii Territories by President William McKinley.

The Mausoleum is one of the only places in Hawaii where the flag of Hawaii can officially fly alone without the American flag; the other three places are ʻIolani Palace, the Puʻuhonua o Hōnaunau Heiau and Thomas Square.

June 24, 1910, the caskets from the Kalākaua family were moved to an underground vault excavated from rock.

In 1922 the main building was converted to a chapel, and the royal remains were moved to tombs constructed on the grounds. The chapel was added to the National Register of Historic Places August 7, 1972.

Kahu of the Royal Mausoleum
These are the keepers or kahu of the Royal Mausoleum at Mauna Ala:
 Nahalau, till 1873
 Joseph Keaoa, from July 10, 1873
 Haumea, from May 3, 1878
 Pius F. Koakanu, until March, 1885
 Lanihau, from March 6, 1885
 Keano, from July 31, 1886
 Naholowaʻa, from September 17, 1888
 Poʻomaikelani (1839–1895), from October 15, 1888
Wiliokai (mentioned in Queen Liliʻuokalani's diary entry), until March 24, 1893
 Maria Angela Kahaʻawelani Beckley Kahea (1847–1909), from March 24, 1893 to July 11, 1909
 David Kaipeʻelua Kahea (1845–1921), from March 24, 1893 to 1915 (jointly with wife)
 Frederick Malulani Beckley Kahea (1882–1949), from 1915 to 1947
 William Edward Bishop Kaiheʻekai Taylor (1882–1956), from 1947 to 1956
 Emily Kekahaloa Namauʻu Taylor, from 1956 to 1961
 ʻIolani Luahine, from 1961 to 1965
 Lydia Namahanaikaleleokalani Taylor Maiʻoho, from 1966 to 1994
 William "Bill" John Kaiheʻekai Maiʻoho, from 1995 to 2015
 William Bishop Kaiheʻekai "Kai" Maiʻoho, from 2015 to present

See also
 List of burials at the Royal Mausoleum of Hawaii
 Thomas Nettleship Staley First Anglican Bishop of Honolulu

References

Further reading

External links

 Interactive Map
 
 
 Mauna Ala, Royal Mausoleum of Hawaii Photo Gallery
 
 Royal Mausoleum State Monument

 
Hawaiian Kingdom
Buildings and structures in Honolulu
Burial sites of Hawaiian royal houses
Cemeteries in Hawaii
Religious buildings and structures in Honolulu
Protected areas of Oahu
Royalty of the Hawaiian Kingdom
Government buildings on the National Register of Historic Places in Hawaii
Monuments and memorials on the National Register of Historic Places in Hawaii
Properties of religious function on the National Register of Historic Places in Hawaii
Government buildings completed in 1865
1865 establishments in Hawaii
Anglican cemeteries in the United States
Churches in Honolulu
House of Kalākaua
House of Kamehameha
Historic American Buildings Survey in Hawaii
Protected areas established in 1900
1900 establishments in Hawaii
Tourist attractions in Honolulu
Gothic Revival architecture in Hawaii
Victorian architecture in Hawaii
National Register of Historic Places in Honolulu
Mausoleums on the National Register of Historic Places